Darmadi (born 1945; as Wong Pek Sen) is an Indonesian badminton player from the 60s to 70s.

Career 
Darmadi competed at the 1966 Asian Games in Bangkok, Thailand. He managed to bring home two medals; a silver in the men's singles and bronze in the mixed doubles. He and with the men's team also succeeded in bringing Indonesia to conquer Malaysia in the third 1969 Asian Badminton Championships in the Philippines for the first time. He also played in the men's doubles with partner Ang Tjin Siang (later known as Muljadi) and won the French Open in 1966. Partnered with Minarni in the mixed doubles, they won 1967 Singapore and Canada Opens. Darmadi and the Indonesian men's team also succeeded in bringing Indonesia back to the winner of the 1970 Thomas Cup men's team championship after defeating Malaysia in the final.

Achievements

Asian Games 
Men's singles

Mixed's doubles

International tournaments 
Men's singles

Men's doubles

Mixed doubles

References 

Living people
1945 births
People from Surakarta
Sportspeople from Central Java
Indonesian male badminton players
Badminton players at the 1966 Asian Games
Asian Games silver medalists for Indonesia
Asian Games bronze medalists for Indonesia
Asian Games medalists in badminton
Medalists at the 1966 Asian Games